is the first color anime feature film and Toei Animation's first theatrical feature film, released in 1958. It was one of the first three anime films to be released in America, under the title Panda and the Magic Serpent, premiering in 1961, the month after Magic Boy. It is also known variously as The Great White Snake and The Tale of the White Serpent. In April 2019, a restored version of the film was selected to be shown in the Cannes Classics section at the 2019 Cannes Film Festival.

Plot
Xu-Xian, a young boy, once owned a pet snake in West Lake until his parents forced him to give her up. Years pass and during a violent storm, the snake magically transforms into the beautiful princess Bai-Niang. Bai-Niang finds Xu-Xian, but the lovers are separated by a local monk, Fa-Hai, who believes that Bai-Niang is an evil spirit. Xu-Xian's two panda pets, Panda and Mimi, try to find Xu-Xian. In the end, Bai-Niang gives up her magical powers and remains in human form to prove that her love for Xu-Xian is genuine.

Cast

Production

The film is essentially an adaptation of the Song Dynasty Chinese folktale Legend of the White Snake (白蛇傳). Shin Uehara adapted the folktale and kept the Chinese-style characters and names. The decision of a Chinese story being used as the concept blueprint came from Toei Doga president Hiroshi Ōkawa, who wanted to strike a tone of reconciliation with the Asian neighbors.

Given the point in time, the film pushed Japanese animation technology to the limit. The film was a large scale major project, involving a total of 13,590 staff; surprisingly, it only took eight months to finish. And while the film received honors at the Venice Children's Film Festival in Italy in 1959, it was regarded as a disappointment when released to the United States on March 15, 1961 by Global Pictures. Historically, this film marked Tōei Dōga's first attempt to follow the example of American feature animation studios and become the so-called "Disney of the east."

The US version made changes to the film such as interpreting the small red panda, Mimi, as a cat. In addition, all traces of the Japanese production teams were removed from the credits.

Rintaro, who would later go on to become a well known and respected director of Japanese animation, had his first job in the animation industry (at age 17) as an in-between animator on this film.

See also
History of anime
The Legend of the White Serpent (1956 film)

References

Bibliography
 Panda and the Magic Serpent, DVD, Cartoon Craze.

External links

1958 films
1958 anime films
1950s fantasy films
Chinese mythology in anime and manga
Films based on the Legend of the White Snake
Japanese animated fantasy films
Japanese fantasy adventure films
Toei Animation films